Tagoropsis is a genus of moths in the family Saturniidae first described by Felder in 1874.

Species

Tagoropsis flavinata (Walker, 1865)
Tagoropsis genoviefae Rougeot, 1950
Tagoropsis hanningtoni (Butler, 1883)
Tagoropsis hecqui Bouyer, 1989
Tagoropsis rougeoti D. S. Fletcher, 1952
Tagoropsis sabulosa Rothschild, 1907

References

Saturniinae